Haruka is a unisex Japanese given name.

Possible writings
Haruka can be written using different kanji characters and can mean:
春香, "spring, fragrance"
春花, "spring, flower"
晴香, "sunny weather, fragrance"
遥花, "distance, flower"
春佳, "spring, good/fine/etc."
遥, "distant"
The name can also be written in hiragana or katakana.

People with the name
, Japanese fashion model
, Japanese-English actress
, Japanese shogi player
, Japanese manga artist
, Japanese actress, model and singer
, Japanese voice actress and singer
, Japanese professional wrestler
, Japanese actress, voice actress and singer
, Japanese manga artist
, Japanese judoka
, Japanese trampoline gymnast
, Japanese actress
, Japanese figure skater
, Japanese tennis player
, Japanese singer, actress and voice actress
, Japanese mathematician and Google developer advocate
, Japanese tennis player
, Japanese singer, actress and television personality
, Japanese gravure idol, television personality and professional wrestler
, Japanese actress
, Japanese javelin thrower
, Japanese singer
, Japanese singer
, Japanese singer and model
, Japanese singer and actress
, Japanese voice actress
, Japanese-born English actress
, pen name of Kazuka Minami, Japanese manga artist
, Japanese volleyball player
, better known as Miya, Japanese singer and member of GWSN
, Japanese voice actress
, Japanese singer and actress
, Japanese voice actress
, Japanese softball player
, Japanese BMX rider
, Japanese singer and actress
, Japanese singer and actress
, Japanese singer and dōjin music composer
, Japanese actress and voice actress
, alias of Japanese voice actress Hiroko Taguchi
, Japanese actress and gravure idol
, Japanese volleyball player
, Japanese judoka
, Japanese writer
, Japanese model and actress
, Japanese voice actress and singer
, Japanese ice hockey player
, Japanese voice actress and singer
, Japanese swimmer
, Japanese handball player
, Japanese ice hockey player
, Japanese model and beauty pageant winner
, Japanese voice actress and singer
, Japanese badminton player
, Japanese voice actress

Fictional characters
Haruka (Ape Escape) or Helga, a character in the video game series Ape Escape
 Haruka, a character in the video game series Senran Kagura
, a character in the tokusatsu series Hikari Sentai Maskman
 Haruka, a character in the video game My Japanese Coach
 or May, a character in the Pokémon media franchise
, a character in the manga series Sister Princess
, a character in the manga series Tactics 
Haruka (Yakuza), a character in the video game Yakuza
Haruka, a character in the anime film Oblivion Island: Haruka and the Magic Mirror
, a character in the video game series The Idolmaster
, a character in the manga series xxxHolic
, a character in the anime series Basquash!
, a character in the anime series Ojamajo Doremi
, protagonist of the anime series Go! Princess PreCure
, a character in the manga series Moyasimon: Tales of Agriculture
, a character in the manga series MegaMan NT Warrior
, a character in the manga series Cuticle Detective Inaba
, protagonist of the anime series Noein
, protagonist of the visual novel Yosuga no Sora
, a character in the tokusatsu series Silver Kamen
, a character from the video game Hatsune Miku: Colorful Stage!
, a character in the media franchise Kagerou Project
, a character in the video game Love Live! School Idol Festival
, protagonist of the manga series Kotoura-San
, a character in the manga series Vampire Knight
, a character in the film Battle Royale II: Requiem
, a character in the manga series After the Rain
, a character in the anime series Devil Hunter Yohko
, a character in the manga series Minami-ke
, protagonist of the media franchise Kaitō Tenshi Twin Angel
, a character in the manga series Tokyo Daigaku Monogatari
, protagonist of the tokusatsu series Kamen Rider Amazons
, a character in the manga series Mirmo!
, protagonist of the visual novel series Uta no Prince-sama
, a character in the anime series Free!
, a character in the manga series Kanamemo
, a character in the light novel series Nogizaka Haruka no Himitsu
, a character in the manga series Harukana Receive
, a character in the visual novel Little Busters!
, a character in the media franchise Strike Witches
, a character in the manga series Castle Town Dandelion
, a character in the media franchise Yakuza
, a character in the manga series Sekirei
, a character in the manga series Chu-Bra!!
, a character in the anime series RahXephon'
, a character in the visual novel Kimi ga Nozomu Eien, a character in the anime series My-HiMEHaruka Takagi, a character in the anime series Soar High! Isami, a character in the manga series Sakura Trick, a character in the manga series Battle Royale, or Sailor Uranus, a character in the manga series Sailor Moon, a character in the manga series Love Hina''

Japanese unisex given names